Gaubertin is a commune in the north east corner of the Loiret department in north-central France, close to the border of the Seine et Marne department. It includes three hamlets, Eau De Limon, Sançy et Bel-Aire.

The writer Pierre Boitel lived in the chateau de Gaubertin 1600–1626.

See also
Communes of the Loiret department

References

Communes of Loiret